Eupithecia laszloi is a moth in the family Geometridae. It is found in Nepal.

The wingspan is about 29.5 mm. The forewings are pale brown and the hindwings are white.

References

Moths described in 2010
laszloi
Moths of Asia